During the 2019–20 season, PSV participated in the Eredivisie, the KNVB Cup, the UEFA Champions League, the UEFA Europa League and the Johan Cruyff Shield.

Players

Squad information

For recent transfers, see List of Dutch football transfers summer 2019 and List of Dutch football transfers winter 2019–20

Transfers

In
Ricardo Rodriguez(on loan from Milan)

Out

Pre-season and friendlies

Competitions

Overview

Eredivisie

League table

Results summary

Results by round

Matches
The Eredivisie schedule was announced on 14 June 2019. The 2019–20 season was abandoned on 24 April 2020, due to the coronavirus pandemic in the Netherlands.

KNVB Cup

Johan Cruyff Shield

UEFA Champions League

Third qualifying round

UEFA Europa League

Group stage

Statistics

Appearances and goals

|-
! colspan="18" style="background:#dcdcdc; text-align:center"| Goalkeepers

|-
! colspan="18" style="background:#dcdcdc; text-align:center"| Defenders

|-
! colspan="18" style="background:#dcdcdc; text-align:center"| Midfielders

|-
! colspan="18" style="background:#dcdcdc; text-align:center"| Forwards

|-
! colspan="18" style="background:#dcdcdc; text-align:center"| Players transferred out during the season

|}

References

External links

PSV Eindhoven seasons
PSV Eindhoven
2019–20 UEFA Europa League participants seasons